is a former Japanese football player.

Playing career
Kanemoto was born in Hyogo Prefecture on October 17, 1962. After graduating from high school, he joined Regional Leagues club Kawasaki Steel (later Vissel Kobe) based in his local in 1981. He played many matches as goalkeeper and the club was promoted to Japan Soccer League in 1986. In 1992, Japan Soccer League was folded and founded the club joined new league Japan Football League. Although he played as regular goalkeeper until 1994, his opportunity to play decreased behind new member Ryuji Ishizue from 1995. The club won the 2nd place in 1996 and was promoted to J1 League from 1997. In 1999, he moved to Prefectural Leagues club River Free Kickers (later Fagiano Okayama). He retired end of 2004 season.

Club statistics

References

External links

1962 births
Living people
Association football people from Hyōgo Prefecture
Japanese footballers
Japan Soccer League players
J1 League players
Japan Football League (1992–1998) players
Vissel Kobe players
Fagiano Okayama players
Association football goalkeepers